Anatoly Rybakov (born 30 January 1956) is a Soviet swimmer who won a silver medal in the  freestyle relay at the 1974 European Aquatics Championships and a bronze medal in the  freestyle relay at the 1975 World Aquatics Championships.

References

External links
Profile at Infosport.ru 
Profile at Ussr-swimming.ru 

1956 births
Living people
Soviet male freestyle swimmers
Burevestnik (sports society) athletes
World Aquatics Championships medalists in swimming
European Aquatics Championships medalists in swimming
People from Sarov
Sportspeople from Nizhny Novgorod Oblast